Hassan Mabrouk (born 29 July 1982) is an Egyptian-Qatari handball player for Al Rayyan and the Qatari national team.

Mabrouk has previously played for the Egyptian national team at the 2008 Summer Olympics.

His brothers, Ashraf, Hazem, Hussein, Belal and Ibrahim, are also international handball players.

References

External links
 
 Hassan Mabrouk at the International Handball Federation

1982 births
Living people
Egyptian male handball players
Naturalised citizens of Qatar
Olympic handball players of Qatar
Handball players at the 2016 Summer Olympics
Asian Games medalists in handball
Asian Games gold medalists for Qatar
Handball players at the 2014 Asian Games
Medalists at the 2014 Asian Games
Qatari people of Egyptian descent
Qatari male handball players